Sunday Night Football is an Australian rules football sports broadcast television program that aired on the Seven Network on 28 April 1991 until 9 April 2000. It was returned to broadcast on Seven from 6 April 2014 until 29 June 2014 in VIC, SA, WA, TAS, and on 7mate from 6 April 2014 to 29 June 2014 in NSW & QLD.

See also
Friday Night Football
Saturday Night Footy
Seven Sport § Australian rules football

References

1991 Australian television series debuts
2000 Australian television series endings
2014 Australian television series debuts
2014 Australian television series endings
Australian Football League
Australian sports television series
Seven Network original programming